Rault is a surname that may refer to:

Didier Rault (born 1968), Founder and Chairman of International Finance Capital
Lucie Rault (born 1944), French ethnomusicologist
Yves Rault (1958–1997), French pianist
Jeb Rault  (born 1971), American guitarist, singer, songwriter

Surnames of Breton origin
Germanic-language surnames